Bo Sture Roland Ohlin (born 3 May 1935) is a retired Swedish biathlon competitor who won four team medals at the world championships in 1958–67. He competed at the 1964 Winter Olympics and finished 12th.

As part of the Swedish team, he won the unofficial relay event during the 1958 World Championships.

References

1935 births
Living people
Biathletes at the 1964 Winter Olympics
Swedish male biathletes
Olympic biathletes of Sweden
Biathlon World Championships medalists
20th-century Swedish people